Agos (in , "furrow") is an Armenian bilingual weekly newspaper published in Istanbul, Turkey, established on 5 April 1996.

Agos has both Armenian and Turkish pages as well as an online English edition. Today, the paper  has a weekly circulation of over 5,000.

History
Turkish-Armenian Hrant Dink was Agos chief editor from the newspaper's beginnings until his assassination outside the newspaper's offices in Istanbul in January 2007.

Hrant Dink's son, Arat Dink, who served as the executive editor of the weekly, had been co-defendant in the cases brought against Hrant Dink for "denigrating Turkishness" on account of his managerial position at the weekly.

After Hrant Dink's assassination, Etyen Mahçupyan was named editor-in-chief. In 2010, he was succeeded in that position by Rober Koptaş. Arat Dink continued to serve as executive editor.

In 2012, a plan made by the Atsız Youth to attack the Agos headquarters was exposed.

In 2015, Yetvart Danzikyan became editor-in-chief of the newspaper and Aris Nalcı executive editor.

References

Further reading

External links 
 Agos 

1996 establishments in Turkey
Newspapers published in Istanbul
Newspapers established in 1996
Armenian-language newspapers
Turkish-language newspapers
Weekly newspapers published in Turkey